Dong District (literally east district) is a gu in central Busan, South Korea. It was one of the first 6 gu of Busan established in 1957.

Busan Station is located in Dong-gu.

Dong-gu has a status of sister localities with Gwangsan-gu in Gwangju and Zhifu District in Yantai City, China.

Administrative divisions

Dong-gu is divided into 4 legal dong, which altogether comprise 17 administrative dong, as follows:

Choryang-dong (5 administrative dong)
Sujeong-dong (5 administrative dong)
Jwacheon-dong (2 administrative dong)
Beomil-dong (5 administrative dong)

Politics

The area is represented in the National Assembly by the West District and East District Busan (South Korean Legislature Constituency)

Education

International schools include:
 Overseas Chinese High School, Busan
 Chinese Korea Busan School (kindergarten and elementary school)

See also
Geography of South Korea

References

External links 
Dong-gu website 
Dong-gu: Busan Metropolitan Government 

 
Districts of Busan